This is a list of awards and nominations received by South Korean actor Lee Min-ho. Lee is acknowledged for his roles in television dramas Boys Over Flowers (2009), City Hunter (2011), and The King: Eternal Monarch (2020) following their global popularity.

Awards and nominations

Other accolades

State and cultural honors

Rankings

Notes

References 

Lee Min-ho